Timothy H. Breen (born September 5, 1942 in Ohio) is currently the William Smith Mason Professor of American History Emeritus at Northwestern University and a James Marsh Professor at Large at the University of Vermont.  He is the founding director of the Kaplan Humanities Center and the Nicholas D. Chabraja Center for Historical Studies at Northwestern.  Breen is a specialist on the American Revolution.  He studies the history of early America with a special interest in political thought, material culture, and cultural anthropology.  Breen has published multiple books and over 60 articles. In 2010 he released his latest book, American Insurgents, American Patriots: The Revolution of the People. Breen won the Colonial War Society Prize for the best book on the American Revolution for Marketplace of Revolution: How Consumer Politics Shaped American Independence (2004), the T. Saloutus Prize for agricultural history for his book Tobacco Culture: The Mentality of the Great Tidewater Planters of the Eve of Revolution, and the Historical Preservation Book Prize for his work Imagining the Past: East Hampton Histories, and several prizes for "George Washington's Journey: The President Forges a New Nation."  Breen also holds awards for distinguished teaching from Northwestern.

Breen received his B.A., M.A., and Ph.D in history from Yale University.  He also holds an honorary M.A. from Oxford University.  In addition to the appointment at Northwestern University, he has taught at Cambridge University (as the Pitt Professor of American History and Institutions), at Oxford University (as the Harold Vyvyan Harmsworth Professor of American History) (2000-2001), and at the University of Chicago, Yale University, and California Institute of Technology.  He is an honorary fellow of the Rothermere American Institute at Oxford University.  He has been the recipient of a Guggenheim Fellowship, and has also enjoyed research support from the National Endowment for the Humanities, Center for Advanced Study, the Humboldt Foundation, the National Humanities Center, the Mellon Foundation, the Munich Center for Advanced Study, the Historisches Kolleg (Munich), and the MacArthur Foundation.  He is a member of the Royal Historical Society and the Society of American Historians.  An essay he published on the end of slavery in Massachusetts became the basis for the full-length opera "Slip-Knot" that was produced in Chicago.  Breen is an alumnus of the Rachel Carson Center for Environmental History (Munich).  He has written for the New York Review of Books, the Times Literary Supplement, The American Scholar, the New York Times, and the London Review of Books.

Breen currently lives in Greensboro, Vermont, where he is currently completing a book entitled "The Farmer and the Aristocrat: American Revolution on Trial."  He is married to Susan, and has two children, Sarah and Bant, and three grandchildren.

Published works

Books
2019 The Will of the People: The Revolutionary Birth of America
2015  George Washington's Journey: The President Forges a New Nation
2010, American Insurgents – American Patriots: The Revolution of the People 
2005, The Marketplace of Revolution: How Consumer Politics Shaped American Independence
2003, Colonial America in an Atlantic World: A Story of Creative Interaction, with Timothy D. Hall
1989, Imagining The Past: East Hampton Histories
1985, Tobacco Culture: The Mentality of the Great Tidewater Planters on the Eve of Revolution
1982, "Myne Owne Ground": Race and Freedom on Virginia's Eastern Shore, 1640-1676, with Stephen Innes
1980, Puritans and Adventurers: Change and Persistence in Early America
1970, The Character of the Good Ruler: A Study of Political Ideas in New England, 1630-1730

Textbooks
2010, America Past and Present, currently in 9th edition (1st ed. published 1984), with George M. Fredrickson, R. Hal Williams, Bill Brands, Ariela Gross, and Robert A. Divine.

Articles
2010, Whose Revolution is this?, Washington Post
2010, The Secret Founding Fathers, The Daily Beast

References

External links
Northwestern University faculty profile
Breen's CV
T. H. Breen Amazon author page
T. H. Breen Goodreads page
T. H. Breen at the Chicago Tribune Printer's Row Lit Fest
A Revolution from Below, The Wall Street Journal, 21 May 2010
Chabraja Center for Historical Studies

21st-century American historians
21st-century American male writers
Northwestern University faculty
Academics of the University of Cambridge
Statutory Professors of the University of Oxford
Harold Vyvyan Harmsworth Professors of American History
Living people
Taft School alumni
Yale Graduate School of Arts and Sciences alumni
1942 births
American male non-fiction writers